WVQR (90.1 FM) was a community radio station broadcasting a news talk/music format. Licensed to Vieques, Puerto Rico, it served the eastern Puerto Rico area. The station was owned by Comite para el Desarrollo y Rescate de Vieques (CPRDV) through Radio Vieques-La Voz del Este, Inc.

WVQR's license was cancelled by the Federal Communications Commission on January 14, 2022.

See also
List of community radio stations in the United States

External links

VQR
Radio stations established in 2013
2013 establishments in Puerto Rico
Defunct community radio stations in the United States
Radio stations disestablished in 2022
2022 disestablishments in Puerto Rico
Community radio stations
Vieques, Puerto Rico